The East Columbia Business District is a section of the planned community of Columbia, Maryland, United States that features a number of large shopping centers and office parks. This district also includes the Columbia Gateway Business Park, which is home to more than 50 companies employing over 17,000 individuals. The business district provides shopping resources for much of Northeastern Howard County. Many locals refer to the area simply as "Dobbin" or "Snowden" due to the major roadways that serve it.

History
During the early 1980s, Maryland Route 175, later known as Rouse Parkway, was extended from the Columbia Town Center to the Maryland Route 108 interchange as a four-lane divided highway. Starting in the 1970s, Columbia's first major business park, the Columbia Gateway Business Park, was developed, eventually comprising 630 acres. Additional major retail developments took place, including Dobbin Center in 1983 and Snowden Square Shopping Center in the early 1990s. In 1997, one of the largest shopping centers, Columbia Crossing, opened on the north side of Route 175 and Dobbin Road. Another large shopping center, Gateway Overlook, opened at the intersection of Routes 175 and 108 in 2007. A Wegmans supermarket opened on McGaw Road in 2012.

Colleges
Numerous educational institutions have satellite campuses located in the Columbia Gateway Business Park:

 Howard Community College
 Johns Hopkins University
 University of Maryland, Baltimore County Training Centers
 University of Phoenix

Shopping centers

 6181 Old Dobbin Lane
 Columbia Auto Center
 Columbia Crossing I 
 Columbia Crossing II
 Dobbin Center
 Snowden Center
 Snowden Square

Major companies
The Columbia Gateway Business Park is home to a number of major companies including:

 Micros  
 SAIC 
 Motorola  
 Nucletron Corp. 
 CareFirst BlueCross BlueShield  
 Johns Hopkins University 
 Magellan Health Services  
 Merkle 
 Honeywell Technology Solutions  
 Sparta, Inc. 
 TRW  
 MTH Electric Trains 
 Wachovia Bank Operations Center  
 Kaiser Permanente 
 Sun MicroSystems  
 CitiFinancial 
 Maxim Healthcare  
 CoStar Group 
 Lifetime Fitness  
 Cadmus Communications 
 Northrop Grumman
 American Healthways

References

External links

Columbia, Maryland
Populated places in Howard County, Maryland
Villages in Howard County, Maryland